HDMS Peter Tordenskiold (F356) was a  in the Royal Danish Navy which was in use until 1990. The ship is named after Peter Tordenskjold, a 17th-century Dano-Norwegian vice admiral.

Design 

The corvettes are fitted with an Otobreda 76 mm main gun, two quad RGM-84C Harpoon Surface-to-surface missile (SSM) launchers, a Mod 3 VLS Sea Sparrow Surface-to-air missile (SAM) launcher carrying 12 missiles, two FIM-92A Stinger SAM launchers, two 20 mm Oerlikon anti-aircraft guns, seven 12.7 mm M/01 LvSa machine guns, and a Mark 3 Depth charge launcher.

Olfert Fischers radar suite consists of two Terma Scanter Mil 009 units for navigation, an EADS TRS-3D air search unit, and a CelsiusTech 9GR 600 surface search unit. Fire control is provided by a CelsiusTech 9 LV 200 gun radar, and a General Dynamics Mk 95 missile radar. She is fitted with a Plessey PMS-26 hull-mounted sonar. The corvette is fitted with a Rascall Cutlass B-1 intercept unit, a Telgon HFD/F unit, and four 6-round Seagnat Mk 36 chaff launchers.

Construction and career 
She was laid down on 3 December 1979 and launched on 30 April 1980 by Aalborg Værft, Aalborg. Commissioned on 2 April 1982.

Peter Tordenskjold was decommissioned in 2009 and was scrapped by Lindø shipyard in February 2013.

Gallery

See also

References

External links 

Niels Juel-class corvettes
Ships built in Aalborg
1980 ships
Corvettes of the Cold War